Rhampsinit (also called Rhampsinitos, Rhampsinitus, Rampsinitus, Rampsinit, derived from Herodotus' Greek Ῥαμψίνιτος Rhampsínitos) is the hellenized name of a fictitious king (pharaoh) from Ancient Egypt. He is named by the ancient Greek historian Herodotus as a literary figure in his Historiae. There it is told that Rhampsinit was the predecessor of the legendary king Kheops. The first tale of Rhampsinit is about two thieves who rob the king until one of them dies. His brother tries to rescue the corpse and then manages to fool the king to avoid arrest. The second tale is about Rhampsinit's visit to Hades.

Tales 
The stories of Rhampsinit are told in book 2 (chapter 121–124) and today known as Rhampsinit and the masterthief and Rhampsinit's visit to Hades. Herodotus starts the story in chapter 121 with a short introduction of the king: “After Proteus, they told me, Rhâmpsinitós received in succession the kingdom, who left as a memorial of himself that gateway to the temple of Hephaistos which is turned towards the West.” Then he tells the two tales of king Rhampsinit:

Rhampsinit and the masterthief 
The king was obviously a well-behaved and gifted business-man, he had hoarded a great treasure of gold, silver and jewelry like never seen or heard about before. To hide and control his treasury the king orders his treasure keeper to build him a secure and well-guarded room, in which the king wishes to store his goods. But the treasure keeper secretly leaves one brick stone loose, so that it could be removed at any time. When on his deathbed, the treasure keeper tells his two sons about the loose stone. The brothers decide to sneak into the treasury house frequently and fill their pockets with loots.

After some time has passed, Rhampsinit becomes aware that his treasury is decreasing and he gets upset. No one can tell him who stole the goods. Mysteriously, the royal seals are still intact and the doors are well guarded as always. After the third incident the king decides to set traps in the room between the vessels. One night the brothers sneak into the treasury room and one of them gets snared in a hidden loop. Recognizing that he cannot escape anymore, he begs his own brother to decapitate him, so that no one could ever identify him. The brother does as wished and with the head of his kinsman he runs to his mother. Meanwhile, king Rhampsinit throws a tantrum when he discovers the body of the trapped thief without head. He orders the guardians to impale the body and display it in town at the enclosure wall of the palace. Anyone who would stop before the corpse in grief should be arrested at once. The mother of the thief urges her son to find a way to retrieve the body of his brother. Should he refuse, she would immediately go to the king and tell him the truth. The thief has no other choice than obey and so he creates a plan.

On a very hot day he charges his two donkeys with full wineskins and guides them along the palace wall, close to the impaled body of his brother. When arriving, he deliberately makes the wineskins rip open. The guardians become curious when the thief laments and scolds his donkeys and the ruckus lures many bystanders who try to calm him down. The thief acts as if he was grateful for the guardian's help and gives them wine from his wineskins. Late that evening, the guards are completely drunk and fall asleep. The thief takes the body and binds it on the donkeys, then he shaves the right cheek of both guards in attempt to humiliate them. Then he flees. Rhampsinit is baffled when he hears about the clever thief. He wants the thief, no matter what the cost. In an attempt to catch him, the king orders his daughter to pretend to be a "maid" in the royal brothel. The princess is ordered to sweet-talk every lover in telling her his most sinister deed. Whoever would tell her the story of the manipulated treasure room, should be arrested by the royal guards. The masterthief visits the princess, too, but smelling a rat he tricks her: He brings the right arm of his deceased brother and then tells her about his deed. When the princess tries to hold him by the arm, he releases the dead arm and flees.

King Rhampsinit is so impressed by the cleverness and ability of the masterthief that he sends out a harbinger to invite him to make peace. He promises his daughter for marriage to the one who could prove  he was the masterthief. The hero accepts the invitation and Rhampsinit keeps his word. The masterthief and the princess marry and the story ends happily.

Rhampsinit's visit to Hades 
After leaving the royal throne to the masterthief, Rhampsinit travels alive to the underworld, which is called “Hades” by the Hellenes. There he plays dice with the goddess Demeter. After defeating her, the king is allowed to return to the realm of the living, and Demeter gives him a golden towel as his prize. As soon as Rhampsinit returns home, all priests of Egypt celebrate a feast; Herodotus says that this feast was still celebrated in his lifetime.

Herodotus closes his stories in chapter 124, where Rhampsinit is followed by a king Kheops, whom the author describes as "cruel" and "evil."

Further sources about Rhampsinit 
Rhampsinit is also mentioned by the late Roman Egyptian historian John of Nikiû, who evidently took his information from Herodotus. However, John of Nikiû confused Rhampsinit partly with king Khufu and additionally reports that Rhampsinit built three temples (the pyramids) and that he closed all temples of the country.

Modern evaluations 
The story of Rhampsinit is today evaluated as some sort of satire, in which a king is fooled by a humble citizen. The tale shows great similarities to other demotic fairy tales, in which Egyptian kings are depicted as being dimwits and their deeds are negligent or cruel. It is also typical for those fables to depict mere servants or citizens as superior to the king. Herodotus´ stories fit perfectly into that schema. In all of his anecdotes he somehow manages to draw a negative or, at least, sinister character picture of any Egyptian ruler. Morris Silver points to similarities of Herodotus´ story to that of Trophónios and Agamedes and the treasury of Hyreus, written by Pausanias in 200 A.D.. The story of Rhampsinit playing dice with Demeter in Hades is seen as an allusion to the old tradition to throw dice in attempt to clear up economical and/or political decisions, such as division of conquered lands or allocations of estates.

In folkloristics, the story of Rhampsinitus is classified in the Aarne-Thompson-Uther Index as tale type ATU 950.

References

Bibliography 
 
 Katharina Wesselmann: Mythische Erzählstrukturen in Herodots "Historien". de Gruyter, Berlin 2011, page 282–286.
 Alexandra von Lieven: Fiktionales und historisches Ägypten (Das Ägyptenbild der Odysee aus ägyptologischer Sicht) In: Andreas Luther: Geschichte und Fiktion in der homerischen Odyssee (interdisziplinäre Tagung, Oktober 2003 an der Freien Universität in Berlin). Beck, München 2006, page 61–76.
 William F. Hansen: Ariadne's Thread: A Guide to International Tales Found in Classical Literature. Cornell University Press, 2002, page 358–262.
 Morris Silver: Taking Ancient Mythology Economically. BRILL, Leiden 1992, page 33–35.
 Wiedemann, Alfred. Altägyptische Sagen und Märchen. Leipzig: Deutsche Verlagsactiengesellschaft. 1906. pp. 146-153.

External link

Kings of Egypt in Herodotus
Fictional kings
ATU 850-999